The C15TA Armoured Truck was an armoured load carrier produced by Canada during the Second World War.
It was developed from the Otter Light Reconnaissance Car.

Development
The C15TA Armoured Truck was developed by General Motors Canada along a concept lines of the American M3 Scout Car. The vehicle used the chassis of the Chevrolet C15 Canadian Military Pattern truck design. Between 1943 and 1945 a total of 3,961 units were built in Oshawa, Ontario. Armoured hulls were supplied by the Hamilton Bridge Company.

Service
The C15TA was used by the British and Canadian units in the Northwest Europe campaign as armoured personnel carrier and ambulance (CT15AA). After the end of the hostilities, many vehicles were left in Europe and were subsequently employed by armies of the liberated European countries, including Belgium, Greece, Denmark (as M6 Mosegris), the Netherlands (which received at least 396 units), and Norway. In addition about 150 were sold by Canada to Spain. Trucks left by the British forces in Vietnam were taken over by the French, which used them in Indochina and later transferred them to South Vietnam. A command variant was also exported to the Union of South Africa.

Many C15TAs were employed by the police forces of the Federation of Malaya.

In 1955, Portugal received a number of vehicles, locally known as GM 4x4 m/947 Granadeiro (Grenadier). They were later used by the Portuguese in the African wars, with some vehicles remaining in service until the 1960s.

See also
Otter Light Reconnaissance Car

References
Notes

Bibliography
И. Мощанский - Бронетанковая техника Великобритании 1939-1945 часть 2, Моделист-Конструктор, Бронеколлекция 1999-02 (I. Moschanskiy - Armored vehicles of the Great Britain 1939-1945 part 2, Modelist-Konstruktor, Bronekollektsiya 1999-02)
 Roger V.Lucy, "The C15TA in Canadian Service", Service Publications,Ottawa, 2012
 List of surviving C15TA trucks (accessed 2019) http://the.shadock.free.fr/Surviving_C15TA_and_Armoured_Command_Vehicles.pdf

External links

MapleLeafup.net
Mosegris

Military trucks of Canada
Armoured personnel carriers of the Cold War
World War II vehicles
Internal security vehicles
Military vehicles introduced from 1940 to 1944
nl:Otter (pantserwagen)